China Mobile Research Institute, the research division of China Mobile, was set up in 2002 with about 20 employees. To date (Dec, 2013), it has more than 800 employees in its headquarters in Beijing. New branches of China Mobile Suzhou Research Institute and China Mobile Hangzhou Institute is under constructions.

Notable research activities

OPhone
DSN
C-RAN

References

External links
 Official Website of China Mobile Research Institute

Telecommunications companies established in 2002
Companies based in Beijing
Chinese companies established in 2002